Jiang Minwen (born 16 June 1997) is a Chinese footballer currently playing as a midfielder for Wuhan Zall of the Chinese Super League.

Club career
Jiang Minwen would be promoted to the senior team of Wuhan Zall in the 2017 China League One campaign and would go on to make his debut on 20 April 2017 in a Chinese FA Cup game against Shanghai Jiading Boo King that ended in a 2-1 defeat. He would go on to be a squad player that gained promotion to the top tier for the club by winning the 2018 China League One division with them.

Career statistics

Honours

Club
Wuhan Zall
 China League One: 2018

References

External links
 

1997 births
Living people
Chinese footballers
Association football midfielders
Wuhan F.C. players
China League One players
Chinese Super League players